

Teams

Changes from last season
Teams promoted from 1946–47 Yugoslav Second League
 Sarajevo

Teams relegated from 1946–47 Yugoslav First League
9th place: Kvarner (Rijeka)
 10th place: Budućnost (Titograd)
 12th place: Željezničar (Sarajevo)
 13th place: 14. Oktobar (Niš)
 14th place: Nafta Lendava

Overview

Notes

FK Pobeda participating in the 1946-47 season was renamed FK Vardar after fussion with another local club FK Makedonija.
FK Pobeda after ending the 1946-47 season at the 8th place has won the relegation play-offs against FK Sloga Novi Sad and remained in the League under the new name FK Vardar.
CS Ponziana was relegated at the 1946-47 season but was readmitted to the first league instead of better placed S.C.F. Quarnero, due to the political need to have Triest-based club in the Yugoslav league, as a propaganda tool.

League table

Results

Winning squad
Champions:
Dinamo Zagreb (coach: Karl Mütsch)

players (league matches/league goals): 
Slavko Arneri 6 (0)
Josip Babić 9 (0)
Aleksandar Benko 9 (4)
Zvonimir Cimermančić 18 (11) 
Željko Čajkovski 18 (6)
Drago Horvat 18 (0)
Ivan Horvat 9 (0)
Ivan Jazbinšek 9 (0)
Marko Jurić 12 (0)
Ratko Kacijan 16 (2)
Mirko Kokotović 2 (0)
Dragutin Lojen 1 (0)
Zvonimir Monsider 3 (0)
Branko Pleše 18 (2)
Krešimir Pukšec 10 (0)
Ivica Rajs 10 (3)
Božidar Senčar 7 (4)
Zvonko Strnad 2 (1)
Đuka Strugar 4 (0)
Franjo Wölfl 17 (22)
1 og

Top scorers

Cup

Round of Sixteen

Quarter finals
Crvena Zvezda Beograd x - x X

Partizan Beograd 2 - 0 Lokomotiva Zagreb

X x - x X

Dinamo Zagreb x - x X

Semi finals
Crvena Zvezda Beograd x - x X

Partizan Beograd 3 - 3 Dinamo Zagreb

Finals
Partizan 0 - 3 Crvena Zvezda

Stadium: Stadion Crvene Zvezde

Attendance: 30,000

Referee: Lemesic (Split)

Partizan: Franjo Šoštarić, Vladimir Firm, M.Petrovic, Zlatko Čajkovski, Milorad Jovanović, Lajčo Jakovetić, Prvoslav Mihajlović, Božidar Drenovac, Stjepan Bobek, Aleksandar Atanacković, Kiril Simonovski

Crvena zvezda: Srđan Mrkušić, Branko Stanković, Milenko Drakulić, Dimitrije Tadić, Milivoje Đurđević, Predrag Đajić, Cokic, Rajko Mitić, Kosta Tomašević, Bela Palfi, Branislav Vukosavljević

See also
Yugoslav Cup
Yugoslav League Championship
Football Association of Yugoslavia

External links
Yugoslavia Domestic Football Full Tables

Yugoslav First League seasons
Yugo
1947–48 in Yugoslav football